Tubulanidae is a family of primitive nemertean worms in the order Palaeonemertea.

Characteristics
Worms in this family have slightly flattened, rounded heads and approximately cylindrical bodies. Apart from the genera, Callinera and Carinina, worms in this family have paired cerebral sensory organs located on either side of the constriction where the head joins the body.
Some species are red or brown, often with distinctive white bands or longitudinal stripes, but others are small and so translucent that their cerebral organs can be seen through the skin.

Genera
The World Register of Marine Species includes the following genera in the group:
 Callinera Bergendal, 1900
 Carinesta Punnett, 1900
 Carinina Hubrecht, 1885
 Parahubrechtia Gibson & Sundberg, 1999
 Protubulanus Chernyshev, 1995
 Tubulanus Renier, 1804

References

Palaeonemertea
Nemertea families